The 2020–21 Army Black Knights women's basketball team represented the United States Military Academy during the 2020–21 NCAA Division I women's basketball season. The Black Knights were led by 15th-year head coach Dave Magarity, and played their home games at Christl Arena in West Point, New York as members of the Patriot League. They finished the season 9–11, 6–8 in Patriot League play to finish in third place in the North Division. They secured the sixth seed in the Patriot League Tournament, losing in the quarterfinals to American.

Previous season
They finished the previous season 9–22, 4–14 in Patriot League play to finish in seventh place. The tournament was cancelled after the Quarterfinals due to the COVID-19 pandemic. The NCAA tournament and NIT were also cancelled due to the pandemic.

Roster

Schedule

|-
!colspan=9 style=| Non-conference regular season
|-

|-
!colspan=9 style=| Patriot League regular season

|-
!colspan=12 style=| Patriot League tournament
|-

Source

See also
2020–21 Army Black Knights men's basketball team

References

Army Black Knights women's basketball seasons
Army
Army Black Knights women's basketball
Army Black Knights women's basketball